Île-de-France (or Isle de France in Old French and Middle French) is a region in France centred on Paris.

Île-de-France or Île de France may also refer to:

Places 
Île-de-France (Greenland), an uninhabited island of the Greenland Sea, Greenland
Isle de France (Mauritius), Mauritius under French rule between 1715 and 1810 as Isle de France
Île-de-France (European Parliament constituency)
Île-de-France, a public square in Paris on the Île de la Cité
Ile-de-France, a sector of Planoise, Besançon, France

Other uses
SS Île de France, a French ocean liner
Île-de-France (sheep), a breed of sheep
Île-de-France, a sculpture by Aristide Maillol

See also 
List of islands of France